The 1953–54 daytime network television schedule for the three major English-language commercial broadcast networks in the United States covers the weekday daytime hours from September 1953 to August 1954.

Talk shows are highlighted in  yellow, local programming is white, reruns of prime-time programming are orange, game shows are pink, soap operas are chartreuse, news programs are gold and all others are light blue. New series are highlighted in bold.

Fall 1953

Winter 1953/1954

Spring 1954

Summer 1954

See also
1953-54 United States network television schedule (prime-time)

References
https://web.archive.org/web/20071015122215/http://curtalliaume.com/abc_day.html
https://web.archive.org/web/20071015122235/http://curtalliaume.com/cbs_day.html
https://web.archive.org/web/20071012211242/http://curtalliaume.com/nbc_day.html
Hyatt, The Encyclopedia of Daytime Television, Billboard Books, 1997
TV schedules, New York Times, September 1953 – September 1954 (microfilm)

United States weekday network television schedules
1953 in American television
1954 in American television